Haplochromis eduardianus is a species of cichlid endemic to Uganda where it is found in Lake George, Lake Edward and the Kazinga Channel.  This species can reach a length of  SL.

References

Fish described in 1914
eduardianus
Endemic freshwater fish of Uganda
Taxonomy articles created by Polbot